Einsteinium(III) chloride is a chloride of einsteinium.

Preparation
Einsteinium(III) chloride is created by reacting einsteinium metal with dry hydrogen chloride gas for 20 minutes at 500 °C which crystallized around 425 °C.

2Es + 6HCl → 2EsCl3 + 3H2

References

Chlorides
Einsteinium compounds
Actinide halides